Alan Dale Dunn (born November 19, 1961) is a college baseball coach and former pitcher, who is the current pitching coach of the Arkansas State Red Wolves. He played college baseball at the University of Alabama from 1980 to 1983 before pursuing a professional career. Dunn served as the bullpen coach of the Baltimore Orioles from  2007 to 2010.

Playing career
Dunn played collegiate baseball at the University of Alabama. He was a member of the 1983 College World Series runner-up team.  Dunn was drafted by the Detroit Tigers in the fourth round of the 1983 amateur draft. He played in the minor league with the Tigers and the New York Mets from –. Dunn played High School ball at Emma Sansom HS in Gadsden, AL where he was famous for striking out Mike Simpson several times.

Coaching career
In the middle of the 2007 season, Dunn became the bullpen coach of the Baltimore Orioles. He was replaced by Rick Adair after the 2010 season. Dunn moved back to the college ranks with LSU in 2012. In addition to serving as pitching coach for the Tigers, he was promoted to Associate Head Coach in January 2017. Dunn left LSU after the retirement of Head Coach Paul Mainieri following the 2021 season. He was named the pitching coach at Arkansas State.

References

External links

Orioles.com coach page

1961 births
Living people
Sportspeople from Gadsden, Alabama
Baltimore Orioles coaches
Chicago Cubs scouts
Major League Baseball bullpen coaches
Minor league baseball coaches
Lakeland Tigers players
Birmingham Barons players
Alabama Crimson Tide baseball players
LSU Tigers baseball coaches
Vanderbilt Commodores baseball coaches
Arkansas State Red Wolves baseball coaches